Jennifer Elizabeth Randerson, Baroness Randerson (born 26 May 1948) is a Welsh Liberal Democrat member of the House of Lords. She is former junior minister in the Wales Office serving in the Cameron–Clegg coalition. Prior to her peerage she was an Assembly Member for Cardiff Central from 1999 to 2011 when she served in the Welsh Labour-Lib Dem administration of the 2000–2003 Welsh Assembly Government.

She is a former Cardiff councillor for Cyncoed. In 2019 she was appointed Chancellor of Cardiff University.

Background
Randerson was educated at Bedford College, University of London, BSc Physiology and Biochemistry, 1983, now part of Royal Holloway, University of London. She was a Cardiff councillor 1983–2000 and was a lecturer at Cardiff Tertiary College. She led the official opposition on the Council in Cardiff for four years. She introduced "Creative Future", a culture strategy for Wales and "Iaith Pawb", a strategy for the promulgation of the Welsh language.

National Assembly for Wales

Randerson was elected as Assembly Member for Cardiff Central at the 1999 Assembly Elections beating the Labour candidate Mark Drakeford. She served as Minister for Culture, Sport and the Welsh Language in the Liberal Democrat/Labour Partnership Government from 2000 to 2003. She was acting Welsh Deputy First Minister from 6 July 2001 to 13 June 2002. She was Health and Social Services; Equal Opportunities and Finance Spokeswoman for the Welsh Liberal Democrats during the Second Assembly. She chaired Assembly Business and Standing Orders Committees during the Second Assembly. 

Randerson stood for the leadership of the Welsh Liberal Democrats in 2008 but was defeated by Kirsty Williams who gained 60% to Jenny's 40% of the all member ballot. In the third Assembly Jenny Randerson was the Liberal Democrat spokesperson on Education, Transport and the Economy. She did not seek re-election at the 2011 Assembly elections, with Nigel Howells – her Liberal Democrat successor, being narrowly defeated by Jenny Rathbone.

House of Lords
On 27 January 2011, she was created a life peer as Baroness Randerson, of Roath Park in the City of Cardiff and was introduced in the House of Lords on 31 January 2011, and sits on the Liberal Democrat benches. On 4 September 2012, she was appointed a Parliamentary Under-Secretary of State at the Wales Office.

Baroness Randerson is the first female Welsh Liberal Democrat to hold ministerial office at Westminster and the first Welsh Liberal to hold a ministerial post since Gwilym Lloyd-George in 1945. Although English by birth and upbringing, she is also the first female non Labour Welsh politician to hold a government post at Westminster.

References

External links
Jenny Randerson AM official biography at the Welsh Assembly website
Jenny Randerson AM profile at the site of Welsh Liberal Democrats

Offices held

1948 births
Living people
Councillors in Cardiff
Liberal Democrat members of the Senedd
Wales AMs 1999–2003
Wales AMs 2003–2007
Wales AMs 2007–2011
Members of the Welsh Assembly Government
Alumni of Bedford College, London
Alumni of Royal Holloway, University of London
Female members of the Senedd
Liberal Democrats (UK) life peers
Life peeresses created by Elizabeth II
Liberal Democrats (UK) councillors
20th-century British women politicians
Women members of the Welsh Assembly Government
Women councillors in Wales